Ciao! Best of Lush is a compilation album by the band Lush, released in March 2001 by 4AD. The essay in the booklet was written by Dominic Wills and included quotes from members Miki Berenyi and Emma Anderson. The best-of CD appeared almost five years after the band's dissolution and drummer Chris Acland's suicide; the compilation was dedicated to his memory.

Track listing

Release history

Credits 
 Tracks 1, 2, 3 and 4 taken from Lovelife, March 1996
 Produced by Pete Bartlett and Lush
 Tracks 5, 7, 8, 9 and 10 taken from Split, June 1994
 Produced by Mike Hedges and Lush
 Track 6 taken from the single "Hypocrite", May 1994
 Produced by Mike Hedges and Lush
 Tracks 11, 12, 13 and 14 taken from Spooky, January 1992
 Produced by Robin Guthrie
 Track 15 taken from the EP Mad Love, February 1990
 Produced by Robin Guthrie
 Track 16 taken from the single "Sweetness and Light", October 1990
 Produced by Tim Friese-Greene
 Tracks 17 and 18 taken from the mini-album Scar, October 1989
 Produced by John Fryer and Lush

Ciao! credits 
 Remastered by John Dent at Loud Mastering.
 Art direction by Vaughan Oliver at v23.
 Design by Chris Bigg at v23.
 Photography by Dominic Davies, from single artwork designed by v23.
 Original photographs by Jim Friedman, Richard Caldicott and Ichiro Kono.
 Portraits by Mike Diver (page 3), Michael Lavine (page 6), Suzie Gibbons (page 12) and Sheila Rock (pages 9–19).

References 

Lush (band) albums
2001 greatest hits albums
4AD compilation albums